Heinz Hilpert (1 March 1890 – 25 November 1967) was a German actor, screenwriter and film director. He was head of the Deutsches Theater during the Third Reich.

Selected filmography
Actor
 Nameless Heroes (1925)
 Prinz Louis Ferdinand (1927)
 His Royal Highness (1953)
 The Golden Plague (1954)
 Die Barrings (1955)
 Roses in Autumn (1955)
 Three Girls from the Rhine (1955)

Director
 Three Days of Love (1931)
 Love, Death and the Devil (1934)
 Lady Windermere's Fan (1935)
 The Devil in the Bottle (1935)

References

Bibliography
 Hortmann, Wilhelm & Hamburger, Michael. Shakespeare on the German Stage: The Twentieth Century. Cambridge University Press, 1998.

External links

1890 births
1967 deaths
German male film actors
Film people from Berlin
German male silent film actors
Male actors from Berlin
20th-century German male actors